Topoisomers or topological isomers are molecules with the same chemical formula and stereochemical bond connectivities but  different topologies. Examples of molecules for which there exist topoisomers include DNA, which can form knots, and catenanes. Each topoisomer of a given DNA molecule possesses a different linking number associated with it. DNA topoisomers can be interchanged by enzymes called topoisomerases. Using a topoisomerase along with an intercalator, topoisomers with different linking number may be separated on an agarose gel via gel electrophoresis.

See also 
 Mechanically-interlocked molecular architectures
 Catenane
 Rotaxanes
 Molecular knot
 Molecular Borromean rings

References 
  New Molecular Topologies Beyond Catenanes and Rotaxanes Essay 2000 Theresa Chang American Chemical Society Online Article

Stereochemistry
Molecular topology